The 145th New York State Legislature, consisting of the New York State Senate and the New York State Assembly, met from January 4 to August 29, 1922, during the second year of Nathan L. Miller's governorship, in Albany.

Background
Under the provisions of the New York Constitution of 1894, re-apportioned in 1917, 51 Senators and 150 assemblymen were elected in single-seat districts; senators for a two-year term, assemblymen for a one-year term. The senatorial districts consisted either of one or more entire counties; or a contiguous area within a single county. The counties which were divided into more than one senatorial district were New York (nine districts), Kings (eight), Bronx (three), Erie (three), Monroe (two), Queens (two) and Westchester (two). The Assembly districts were made up of contiguous area, all within the same county.

At this time there were two major political parties: the Republican Party and the Democratic Party. The Socialist Party also nominated tickets.

Elections
The New York state election, 1921, was held on November 8. The only statewide elective office up for election was a judgeship on the New York Court of Appeals which was carried by Republican William Shankland Andrews. The approximate party strength at this election, as expressed by the vote for Judge of the Court of Appeals, was: Republicans 1,146,000; Democrats 1,081,000; and Socialists 146,000.

The only assemblywoman of 1921, Marguerite L. Smith (Rep.), an athletics teacher, of Harlem, was defeated for re-election, and no women were elected to the Legislature of 1922.

Sessions
The Legislature met for the regular session at the State Capitol in Albany on January 4, 1922; and adjourned on March 17.

H. Edmund Machold (Rep.) was re-elected Speaker.

The Legislature met for a special session at the State Capitol in Albany on August 28 and 29, 1922. This session was called to deal with the shortage of coal. The Legislature created the office of State Fuel Administrator, and William H. Woodin was appointed by Governor Miller to the post. Woodin resigned on January 8, 1923, and Governor Al Smith appointed George W. Goethals to succeed. The post was abolished by Smith, effective on April 1, 1923.

State Senate

Districts

Members
The asterisk (*) denotes members of the previous Legislature who continued in office as members of this Legislature.

Note: For brevity, the chairmanships omit the words "...the Committee on (the)..."

Employees
 Clerk: Ernest A. Fay
 Sergeant-at-Arms: 
 Assistant Sergeant-at-Arms: 
 Principal Doorkeeper: 
 First Assistant Doorkeeper: 
 Stenographer:

State Assembly

Assemblymen
Note: For brevity, the chairmanships omit the words "...the Committee on (the)..."

Employees
 Clerk: Fred W. Hammond
Postmaster: James H. Underwood

Notes

Sources
 CITIZENS UNION GIVES LINE ON CANDIDATES in NYT on October 26, 1921
 Journal of the Assembly (145th Session) (1922; Vol. II; from March 1 to 14)
 ASSEMBLY COMMITTEES in The Troy Times, of Troy, on January 10, 1922
 Members of the New York Assembly (1920s) at Political Graveyard

145
1922 in New York (state)
1922 U.S. legislative sessions